The Chiricahua leopard frog (Lithobates chiricahuensis syn. Rana chiricahuensis) is a species of frog in the family Ranidae, the true frogs.

Distribution and habitat
It is native to Mexico and the United States (Arizona and New Mexico). Its natural habitats are temperate forests, rivers, intermittent rivers, swamps, freshwater lakes, intermittent freshwater lakes, freshwater marshes, intermittent freshwater marshes, freshwater springs, ponds, and open excavations.

Conservation
It is threatened by habitat loss and chytrid fungus to such an extent that it has been eliminated from 80% of its former habitat. The Phoenix Zoo, Arizona's Department of Game and Fish, and the USFWS are trying to mitigate threats through captive breeding and reintroduction efforts.

Phylogeny
A 2011 genetic analysis provided evidence that the northwestern Mogollon Rim population of  L. chiricahuensis is indistinguishable from specimens of the extinct Vegas Valley leopard frog (Lithobates fisheri).

The Ramsey Canyon leopard frog (Lithobates subaquavocalis) has also been shown to be conspecific with the Chiricahua leopard frog.

References

Further reading

Hillis, D. M., et al. (1983). Phylogeny and biogeography of the Rana pipiens complex: A biochemical evaluation. Systematic Zoology 32, 132–43.
Hillis, D. M. (1988). Systematics of the Rana pipiens complex: Puzzle and paradigm. Annual Review of Systematics and Ecology 19, 39–63.
Hillis, D. M. and T. P. Wilcox. (2005). Phylogeny of the New World true frogs (Rana). Molecular Phylogenetics and Evolution 34(2), 299–314.
Hillis, D. M. (2007). Constraints in naming parts of the Tree of Life. Molecular Phylogenetics and Evolution 42, 331–38.
Platz, J. E. and J. S. Mecham. (1979). Rana chiricahuensis, a new species of leopard frog (Rana pipiens complex) from Arizona. Copeia 3, 383–90.
  (2004): Mitochondrial DNA sequences do not support species status of the Ramsey Canyon leopard frog (Rana subaquavocalis). J Herpetol 38:313–319. doi: 10.1670/117-03A

Lithobates
Amphibians of Mexico
Chiricahua Mountains
Amphibians described in 1979
Taxonomy articles created by Polbot
ESA threatened species